The El-Keib Cabinet formed the interim executive government of Libya from 2011 to 2012. Following the removal of Gaddafi, an interim cabinet, sometimes called the Transitional Executive Board, composed of the following ministers, was sworn in on 4 December 2011. and functioned as a caretaker government until the 2012 elections and the installation of Ali Zeidan's government.

References

External links 
 National Transitional Council of Libya: The Executive Board: Overview 

Cabinet, El-Keib
Cabinet, El-Keib
Cabinet, El-Keib
Libya, El-Keib Cabinet
Libya, El-Keib Cabinet
Libyan Crisis (2011–present)
Political history of Libya